Laura Letitia Smith Krey (December 18, 1890 – November 8, 1985) was an American author from Texas.  Her 1938 historical novel And Tell of Time was a bestseller that year.

References

1890 births
1985 deaths
Writers from Texas
20th-century American women writers
20th-century American writers